Ebrişim is a village in the District of Aladağ, Adana Province, Turkey.

References

Villages in Aladağ District